The Good Night is a 2007 fantasy comedy-drama film written and directed by Jake Paltrow. The film stars his sister Gwyneth Paltrow, Penélope Cruz, Martin Freeman, Danny DeVito, Simon Pegg and others. The movie takes place in London and New York City, where a former pop star (Freeman) who now writes commercial jingles for a living experiences a mid-life crisis.

The movie was released on the 2007 Sundance Film Festival.

Plot
The movie follows a man's search for perfection in a world where life rarely measures up to the idealized images that constantly bombard us.

Gary Shaller (Freeman), who gained commercial success in the past as the keyboard player in the band "On the One", is in a failing relationship with Dora (Gwyneth Paltrow), and working for his former bandmate Paul (Simon Pegg), writing and recording commercial jingles. Gary is having lucid dreams about a woman named Anna (Penélope Cruz), with whom he is deeply infatuated. He learns more about lucid dreaming by buying books and attending classes taught by lucid-dreaming guru, Mel (Danny DeVito).

Gary eventually discovers that the girl he dreams about does, in fact, exist. Paul arranges for Gary to meet her, but this proves disappointing, as she fails to live up to the expectations that Gary has built up in his dreams of her. He eventually continues to dream about her, even soundproofs his apartment, and makes other efforts to be able to sleep longer, so that he can remain with Anna for longer periods of time.

Eventually, feeling as though he is betraying Dora, he attempts to go back to her. While crossing the street to reach her, he is hit by a car. As the movie ends, he is fully immersed in his dream world, apparently while being in a coma in a hospital.

Cast

Production
The production filmed at Capel Manor Guest Pavilion in Kent to shoot the scenes at the house in Gary's dreams where he meets Anna.

References

External links
 
 
 
The Good Night

2007 films
2007 romantic comedy films
American romantic comedy films
British romantic comedy films
Films about music and musicians
Films directed by Jake Paltrow
2000s English-language films
2000s American films
2000s British films